Porbandar railway station is a terminus station in the coastal city of Porbandar in the Indian state of Gujarat. It belongs to the Bhavnagar Division of Western Railways. It is one of the westernmost broad-gauge railway stations in India.

History
Porbandar railway station was owned by Porbandar State Railway during the Princely rule. Porbandar–JamJodhpur metre-gauge railway line was opened in 1888 by working with Bhavnagar–Gondal–Junagad–Porbandar Railway. Later it was merged into Saurashtra Railway in 1948. Further it is under taken by Western Railway on 5 November 1951. Gauge conversion of Wansajaliya–Jetalsar section completed in 2011 giving connectivity to Somnath.

Trains

The following trains start from Porbandar railway station:

References

External links

Railway stations in Porbandar district
Railway stations in India opened in 1888
Bhavnagar railway division
Transport in Porbandar